A war crime is a violation of the laws of war that gives rise to individual criminal responsibility for actions by combatants in action, such as intentionally killing civilians or intentionally killing prisoners of war, torture, taking hostages, unnecessarily destroying civilian property, deception by perfidy, wartime sexual violence, pillaging, and for any individual that is part of the command structure who orders any attempt to committing mass killings including genocide or ethnic cleansing, the granting of no quarter despite surrender, the conscription of children in the military and flouting the legal distinctions of proportionality and military necessity.

The formal concept of war crimes emerged from the codification of the customary international law that applied to warfare between sovereign states, such as the Lieber Code (1863) of the Union Army in the American Civil War and the Hague Conventions of 1899 and 1907 for international war. In the aftermath of the Second World War, the war-crime trials of the leaders of the Axis powers established the Nuremberg principles of law, such as that international criminal law defines what is a war crime. In 1949, the Geneva Conventions legally defined new war crimes and established that states could exercise universal jurisdiction over war criminals. In the late 20th century and early 21st century, international courts extrapolated and defined additional categories of war crimes applicable to a civil war.

History

Early examples
In 1474, the first trial for a war crime was that of Peter von Hagenbach, realised by an ad hoc tribunal of the Holy Roman Empire, for his command responsibility for the actions of his soldiers, because "he, as a knight, was deemed to have a duty to prevent" criminal behaviour by a military force. Despite having argued that he had obeyed superior orders, von Hagenbach was convicted, condemned to death, and beheaded.

Hague Conventions

The Hague Conventions were international treaties negotiated at the First and Second Peace Conferences at The Hague, Netherlands, in 1899 and 1907, respectively, and were, along with the Geneva Conventions, among the first formal statements of the laws of war and war crimes in the nascent body of secular international law.

Geneva Conventions

The Geneva Conventions are four related treaties adopted and continuously expanded from 1864 to 1949 that represent a legal basis and framework for the conduct of war under international law. Every single member state of the United Nations has currently ratified the conventions, which are universally accepted as customary international law, applicable to every situation of armed conflict in the world. However, the Additional Protocols to the Geneva Conventions adopted in 1977 containing the most pertinent, detailed and comprehensive protections of international humanitarian law for persons and objects in modern warfare are still not ratified by several states continuously engaged in armed conflicts, namely the United States, Israel, India, Pakistan, Iraq, Iran, and others. Accordingly, states retain different codes and values about wartime conduct. Some signatories have routinely violated the Geneva Conventions in a way that either uses the ambiguities of law or political maneuvering to sidestep the laws' formalities and principles.

The first three conventions have been revised and expanded, with the fourth one added in 1949:
 The First Geneva Convention for the Amelioration of the Condition of the Wounded and Sick in Armed Forces in the Field was adopted in 1864 and then significantly revised and replaced by the 1906 version, the 1929 version, and later the First Geneva Convention of 1949.
 The Second Geneva Convention for the Amelioration of the Condition of Wounded, Sick and Shipwrecked Members of Armed Forces at Sea was adopted in 1906 and then significantly revised and replaced by the Second Geneva Convention of 1949.
 The Third Geneva Convention relative to the Treatment of Prisoners of War was adopted in 1929 and then significantly revised and replaced by the Third Geneva Convention of 1949.
 The Fourth Geneva Convention relative to the Protection of Civilian Persons in Time of War was first adopted in 1949, based on parts of the 1907 Hague Convention IV.

Two Additional Protocols were adopted in 1977 with the third one added in 2005, completing and updating the Geneva Conventions:
 Protocol I (1977) relating to the Protection of Victims of International Armed Conflicts.
 Protocol II (1977) relating to the Protection of Victims of Non-International Armed Conflicts.
 Protocol III (2005) relating to the Adoption of an Additional Distinctive Emblem.

Leipzig trials

Just after WWI the world governments started to try and systematically create a code for how War Crimes would be defined. Their first outline of a law was "Instructions for the Government of Armies of the United States in the Field"—also known as the “Lieber Code.”  A small number of German military personnel of the First World War were tried in 1921 by the German Supreme Court for alleged war crimes.

London Charter/Nuremberg Trials 1945 

The modern concept of war crime was further developed under the auspices of the Nuremberg Trials based on the definition in the London Charter that was published on August 8, 1945 (also see Nuremberg Principles). Along with war crimes the charter also defined crimes against peace and crimes against humanity, which are often committed during wars and in concert with war crimes.

International Military Tribunal for the Far East 1946 

Also known as the Tokyo Trial, the Tokyo War Crimes Tribunal or simply as the Tribunal, it was convened on May 3, 1946, to try the leaders of the Empire of Japan for three types of crimes: "Class A" (crimes against peace), "Class B" (war crimes), and "Class C" (crimes against humanity), committed during World War II.

International Criminal Court 2002 

On July 1, 2002, the International Criminal Court, a treaty-based court located in The Hague, came into being for the prosecution of war crimes committed on or after that date.  Several nations, most notably the United States, China, Russia, and Israel, have criticized the court. The United States still participates as an observer. Article 12 of the Rome Statute provides jurisdiction over the citizens of non-contracting states if they are accused of committing crimes in the territory of one of the state parties.

War crimes are defined in the statute that established the International Criminal Court, which includes:
 Grave breaches of the Geneva Conventions, such as:
 Willful killing, or causing great suffering or serious injury to body or health
 Torture or inhumane treatment
 Unlawful wanton destruction or appropriation of property
 Forcing a prisoner of war to serve in the forces of a hostile power
 Depriving a prisoner of war of a fair trial
 Unlawful deportation, confinement or transfer
 Taking hostages
 Directing attacks against civilians
 Directing attacks against humanitarian workers or UN peacekeepers
 Killing a surrendered combatant
 Misusing a flag of truce, a flag or uniform of the enemy
 Settlement of occupied territory
 Deportation of inhabitants of occupied territory
 Using poison weapons
 Using civilians as shields
 Using child soldiers
 Firing upon a Combat Medic with clear insignia.
 The following acts as part of a non-international conflict:
 Murder, cruel or degrading treatment and torture
 Directing attacks against civilians, humanitarian workers or UN peacekeepers
 The following acts as part of an international conflict:
 Taking hostages
 Summary execution
 Pillage
 Rape, sexual slavery, forced prostitution or forced pregnancy

However the court only has jurisdiction over these crimes where they are "part of a plan or policy or as part of a large-scale commission of such crimes".

Prominent indictees

Heads of state and government

To date, the present and former heads of state and heads of government that have been charged with war crimes include:
 Russian President Vladimir Putin for the illegal abduction of children from Ukraine and deportation into Russia during the Russian invasion of Ukraine.
 German Großadmiral and President Karl Dönitz and Japanese Prime Ministers and Generals Hideki Tōjō and Kuniaki Koiso in the aftermath of World War II.
 Former Serbian President Slobodan Milošević was brought to trial charges with, genocide, crimes against humanity, and war crimes in three republics. This pertained to superior responsibility for the Bosnia and Croatia indictments, and individual responsibility for the Kosovo indictment. He was acquitted, however, as he died in custody in 2006, before the trial could be concluded.
 Former Liberian President Charles G. Taylor was also brought to The Hague charged with war crimes; his trial stretched from 2007 to March 2011. He was convicted in April 2012 of aiding and abetting crimes against humanity.
 Former Bosnian Serb President Radovan Karadžić was arrested in Belgrade on July 18, 2008, and brought before Belgrade's War Crimes Court a few days after. He was extradited to the Netherlands, and is currently in The Hague, in the custody of the International Criminal Tribunal for the former Yugoslavia. The trial began in 2010. On March 24, 2016, he was found guilty of genocide in Srebrenica, war crimes and crimes against humanity, 10 of the 11 charges in total, and sentenced to 40 years' imprisonment. He was sentenced to life on appeal.
 Omar al-Bashir, former head of state of Sudan, is charged with three counts of genocide, crimes against humanity and other war crimes regarding the war in the Darfur region of Sudan.
 Former Libyan leader Muammar Gaddafi was indicted for allegedly ordering the killings of protesters and civilians and Crimes against Humanity, during the 2011 Libyan civil war, however, he was killed in October 2011 before he could stand trial.

Other
 Yoshijirō Umezu, a general in the Imperial Japanese Army
 Seishirō Itagaki, War minister of the Empire of Japan
 Hermann Göring, Commander in Chief of the Luftwaffe.
 Ernst Kaltenbrunner and Adolf Eichmann, high-ranking members of the SS.
 Wilhelm Keitel, Generalfeldmarschall, head of the Oberkommando der Wehrmacht.
 Erich Raeder, Großadmiral, Commander in Chief of the Kriegsmarine.
 Albert Speer, Minister of Armaments and War Production in Nazi Germany 1942–45.
 William Calley, former U.S. Army officer found guilty of murder for his role in the Mỹ Lai massacre.
 General Tikka Khan, aka "Butcher of Bengal" was a notorious Pakistan Army General known for his war crimes in Bangladesh during the Indo-Pakistani War of 1971.
 Ali Hassan Abd al-Majid al-Tikriti, more commonly known by his nickname "Chemical Ali", executed by post-Ba'athist Iraq for his leadership of the gassing of Kurdish villages during the Iran-Iraq War; also governor of illegally occupied Kuwait during the First Gulf War 
 Ratko Mladić, indicted for genocide amongst other violations of humanitarian law during the Bosnian War; he was captured in Serbia in May 2011 and was extradited to face trial in The Hague, wherein he was found guilty and sentenced to life in prison.
 Joseph Kony, leader of the Lord's Resistance Army, guerrilla group which used to operate in Uganda.

Definition

War crimes are serious violations of the rules of customary and treaty law concerning international humanitarian law that have become accepted as criminal offenses for which there is individual responsibility.
Colloquial definitions of war crime include violations of established protections of the laws of war, but also include failures to adhere to norms of procedure and rules of battle, such as attacking those displaying a peaceful flag of truce, or using that same flag as a ruse to mount an attack on enemy troops. The use of chemical and biological weapons in warfare are also prohibited by numerous chemical arms control agreements and the Biological Weapons Convention. Wearing enemy uniforms or civilian clothes to infiltrate enemy lines for espionage or sabotage missions is a legitimate ruse of war, though fighting in combat or assassinating individuals behind enemy lines while so disguised is not, as it constitutes unlawful perfidy. Attacking enemy troops while they are being deployed by way of a parachute is not a war crime. However, Protocol I, Article 42 of the Geneva Conventions explicitly forbids attacking parachutists who eject from disabled aircraft and surrendering parachutists once landed. Article 30 of the 1907 Hague Convention IV – The Laws and Customs of War on Land explicitly forbids belligerents to punish enemy spies without previous trial.

The rule of war, also known as the Law of Armed Conflict, permit belligerents to engage in combat. A war crime occurs when superfluous injury or unnecessary suffering is inflicted upon an enemy.

War crimes also include such acts as mistreatment of prisoners of war or civilians. War crimes are sometimes part of instances of mass murder and genocide though these crimes are more broadly covered under international humanitarian law described as crimes against humanity. In 2008, the U.N. Security Council adopted Resolution 1820, which noted that "rape and other forms of sexual violence can constitute war crimes, crimes against humanity or a constitutive act with respect to genocide"; see also wartime sexual violence. In 2016, the International Criminal Court convicted someone of sexual violence for the first time; specifically, they added rape to a war crimes conviction of Congo Vice President Jean-Pierre Bemba Gombo.

War crimes also included deliberate attacks on citizens and property of neutral states, such as the Japanese attack on Pearl Harbor. As the attack on Pearl Harbor happened while the U.S. and Japan were at peace and without a just cause for self-defense, the attack was declared by the Tokyo Trials to go beyond justification of military necessity and therefore constituted a war crime.

War crimes are significant in international humanitarian law because it is an area where international tribunals such as the Nuremberg Trials and Tokyo Trials have been convened. Recent examples are the International Criminal Tribunal for the Former Yugoslavia and the International Criminal Tribunal for Rwanda, which were established by the UN Security Council acting under Chapter VIII of the UN Charter.

Under the Nuremberg Principles, war crimes are different from crimes against peace.  Crimes against peace include planning, preparing, initiating, or waging a war of aggression, or a war in violation of international treaties, agreements, or assurances.  Because the definition of a state of "war" may be debated, the term "war crime" itself has seen different usage under different systems of international and military law. It has some degree of application outside of what some may consider being a state of "war", but in areas where conflicts persist enough to constitute social instability.

The legalities of war have sometimes been accused of containing favoritism toward the winners ("Victor's justice"), as some controversies have not been ruled as war crimes. Some examples include the Allies' destruction of Axis cities during World War II, such as the firebombing of Dresden, the Operation Meetinghouse raid on Tokyo (the most destructive single bombing raid in history), and the atomic bombings of Hiroshima and Nagasaki.  In regard to the strategic bombing during World War II, there was no international treaty or instrument protecting a civilian population specifically from attack by aircraft, therefore the aerial attacks on civilians were not officially war crimes. The Allies at the trials in Nuremberg and Tokyo never prosecuted the Germans, including Luftwaffe commander-in-chief Hermann Göring, for the bombing raids on Warsaw, Rotterdam, and British cities during the Blitz as well as the indiscriminate attacks on Allied cities with V-1 flying bombs and V-2 rockets, nor the Japanese for the aerial attacks on crowded Chinese cities.

Controversy arose when the Allies re-designated German POWs (under the protection of the 1929 Geneva Convention on Prisoners of War) as Disarmed Enemy Forces (allegedly unprotected by the 1929 Geneva Convention on Prisoners of War), many of which were then used for forced labor such as clearing minefields. By December 1945, six months after the war had ended, it was estimated by French authorities that 2,000 German prisoners were still being killed or maimed each month in mine-clearing accidents. The wording of the 1949 Third Geneva Convention was intentionally altered from that of the 1929 convention so that soldiers who "fall into the power" following surrender or mass capitulation of an enemy are now protected as well as those taken prisoner in the course of fighting.

United Nations 
The United Nations gives the following definition:
 Intentional murder of innocent people;
 Torture or inhuman treatment, including biological experiments; 
 Willfully causing great suffering, or serious injury to body or health;
 Compelling a prisoner of war or other protected person to serve in the forces of hostile power;
 Use by children under the age of sixteen years into armed forces or groups or using them to participate actively in hostilities;
 Intentionally directing attack against the civilian population as not taking direct part in hostilities;
 Extensive destruction and appropriation of property, not justified by military necessity and carried out unlawfully and wantonly; 
 Destroying or seizing the property of an adversary unless demanded by necessities of the conflict;
 Using poison or poisoned weapons;
 Intentionally directing attack against building dedicated to religion, education, art, science or charitable purposes, historic monuments, hospitals as long as it's not used as military infrastructure;
 Wilfully depriving a prisoner of war or other protected person of the rights of fair and regular trial; 
 Attacking or bombarding towns, villages, dwellings or buildings which are undefended and which are not military objectives;
 Unlawful deportation or transfer or unlawful confinement;
 Taking of hostages.
 Intentional assault with the knowledge that such an assault would result in loss of life or casualty to civilians or damage to civilian objects or extensive, long-term and severe damage to the natural environment that would be clearly excessive in relation to the concrete and direct.

Legality of civilian casualties 
Under the law of armed conflict (LOAC), the death of non-combatants is not necessarily a violation; there are many things to take into account. Civilians cannot be made the object of an attack, but the death/injury of civilians while conducting an attack on a military objective are governed under principles such as of proportionality and military necessity and can be permissible. Military necessity "permits the destruction of life of ... persons whose destruction is incidentally unavoidable by the armed conflicts of the war; ... it does not permit the killing of innocent inhabitants for purposes of revenge or the satisfaction of a lust to kill. The destruction of property to be lawful must be imperatively demanded by the necessities of war."

For example, conducting an operation on an ammunition depot or a terrorist training camp would not be prohibited because a farmer is plowing a field in the area; the farmer is not the object of attack and the operations would adhere to proportionality and military necessity. On the other hand, an extraordinary military advantage would be necessary to justify an operation posing risks of collateral death or injury to thousands of civilians. In "grayer" cases the legal question of whether the expected incidental harm is excessive may be very subjective. For this reason, States have chosen to apply a "clearly excessive" standard for determining whether a criminal violation has occurred.

When there is no justification for military action, such as civilians being made the object of attack, a proportionality analysis is unnecessary to conclude that the attack is unlawful.

International Criminal Tribunal for the former Yugoslavia 
For aerial strikes, pilots generally have to rely on information supplied by external sources (headquarters, ground troops) that a specific position is in fact a military target. In the case of former Yugoslavia, NATO pilots hit a civilian object (the Chinese embassy in Belgrade) that was of no military significance, but the pilots had no idea of determining it aside from their orders. The committee ruled that "the aircrew involved in the attack should not be assigned any responsibility for the fact they were given the wrong target and that it is inappropriate to attempt to assign criminal responsibility for the incident to senior leaders because they were provided with wrong information by officials of another agency". The report also notes that "Much of the material submitted to the OTP consisted of reports that civilians had been killed, often inviting the conclusion to be drawn that crimes had therefore been committed. Collateral casualties to civilians and collateral damage to civilian objects can occur for a variety of reasons."

Rendulic Rule 
The Rendulic Rule is a standard by which commanders are judged.

German General Lothar Rendulic was charged for ordering extensive destruction of civilian buildings and lands while retreating from a suspected enemy attack in what is called scorched earth policy for the military purpose of denying the use of ground for the enemy. The German troops retreating from Finnish Lapland believed Finland would be occupied by Soviet troops and destroyed many settlements while retreating to Norway under the command of Rendulic. He overestimated the perceived risk but argued that Hague IV authorized the destruction because it was necessary to war. He was acquitted of that charge.

Under the "Rendulic Rule" persons must assess the military necessity of an action based on the information available to them at that time; they cannot be judged based on information that subsequently comes to light.

See also

Country listings

 Allied war crimes during World War II
 Bangladeshi genocide
 Bihari genocide
Kashmiri genocide
 British war crimes
 East Timor Genocide
 German war crimes
 Consequences of Nazism
 The Holocaust
 Myth of the clean Wehrmacht
 War crimes of the Wehrmacht
 International Military Tribunal for the Far East
 Islamic State war crime findings
 Italian war crimes
 Japanese war crimes
 Korean War crimes
 Saudi Arabian-led intervention in Yemen
 Soviet war crimes
 Russian war crimes
 United States Senate Committee on the Philippines
 United States war crimes
 Vietnam War#War crimes

Legal issues

 American Service-Members' Protection Act
 Command responsibility
 Law of war
 Metropolitan Police War Crimes Unit
 Rule of law
 Rule of Law in Armed Conflicts Project (RULAC)
 Russell Tribunal
 Special Court for Sierra Leone
 The International Criminal Court and the 2003 invasion of Iraq
 Universal jurisdiction
 War Crimes Law (Belgium)
 War Crimes Act 1991
 War Crimes Act of 1996

Miscellaneous

 Civilian internee
 Chronicles of Terror
 Commando order
 Commissar order
 Crime of aggression
 Doctors' Trial
 Forensic archaeology
 Human shield
 International Criminal Court investigations
 Katyn massacre
 List of denaturalized former citizens of the United States, including those citizens who were denaturalized for concealing their involvement in war crimes in order to obtain that country's citizenship
 Looting
 Mass atrocity crimes
 Mass killing
 Military use of children
 Nazi human experimentation
 NKVD prisoner massacres
 No quarter
 Nuremberg Principles
 Razakars (Pakistan)
 Mukti Bahini
 Indian Army
 Satellite Sentinel Project
 Srebrenica massacre
 State terrorism
 State-sponsored terrorism
 Terror bombing
 Transitional justice
 Unlawful combatant
 War and genocide
 Wartime sexual violence
 Winter Soldier Investigation

References

Further reading
 
 
 Hagopian, Patrick (2013). American Immunity: War Crimes and the Limits of International Law. Amherst, MA: University of Massachusetts Press.

External links

 Australian Bunker And Military Museum - abmm.org
 
 
 
 
 Human Rights First; Command's Responsibility: Detainee Deaths in U.S. Custody in Iraq and Afghanistan
 TheRule of Law in Armed Conflicts Project
 Iraqi Special Tribunal
 Crimes of War Project
 Rome Treaty of the International Criminal Court
 Special Court for Sierra Leone
 Ad-Hoc Court for East Timor
 CBC Digital Archives -Fleeing Justice: War Criminals in Canada
 A Criminological Analysis of the Invasion and Occupation of Iraq By Ronald C. Kramer and Raymond J. Michalowski
 Investigating Human Rights – Reaching Out to Diaspora Communities in U.S. for War Crimes Tips (FBI)
 UK's Geneva Conventions (Amendment) Act 1995 – which bans War Crimes

 
Crime by type
Aftermath of war
International criminal law
Law of war
Violence against men
Warfare
Violence against women